The 2022 Football Queensland season will be the tenth season since NPL Queensland commenced as the top tier of Queensland men’s football. This season will also be the fifth season of the Football Queensland Premier League and the second season of the Football Queensland Premier League 2, representing the second and third tiers of Queensland men's football respectively. This season will also be the inaugural season of the FQPL Champions League for the Northern Conference.  

Below NPL Queensland and the FQPL is a regional structure of nine zones with their own leagues.

Football Queensland

National Premier Leagues Queensland

Football Queensland Premier League

Football Queensland Premier League 2

Football Darling Downs

Football Queensland Premier League 3 − Darling Downs

Football Queensland Metro

Football Queensland Premier League 3 − Metro

Football Queensland Premier League 4 − Metro

Football Queensland Premier League 5 − Metro

Football Queensland Premier League 6 − Metro

Football Queensland South Coast

Football Queensland Premier League 3 − South Coast

Football Queensland Premier League 4 − South Coast

Football Sunshine Coast

Football Queensland Premier League 3 − Sunshine Coast

References 

Football Queensland seasons
2022 in Australian soccer